Eti or ETI or ETİ may refer to:

People 
 Eti Livni (born 1948), Israeli politician
 Eti Saaga (1950–2017), American Samoan writer
 Eti Tavares (born 1993), Bissau-Guinean footballer

Other uses 
 Eti (film), a 2008 Bengali film
 Eti River, Sarem Island, Indonesia
 Ecobank Transnational Inc., a pan-African banking conglomerate
 Effector-triggered immunity
 Electric Transit, Inc., a defunct American trolleybus manufacturer
 Electronic Temperature Instruments, a British instrumentation manufacturer
 Electronics Today International, a defunct magazine
 Elemental Technologies, Inc., an American video software company
 Energy Technologies Institute, a British energy research institute
 Ente Tabacchi Italiani, and Italian tobacco company
 Equipment and Tool Institute, an American automotive trade association
 Ethical Trading Initiative, a British membership organisation promoting ethical supply-chain management
 Evolutionary Technologies International, an American IT company
 Extraterrestrial intelligence
 "E.T.I. (Extra Terrestrial Intelligence)", a song by Blue Oyster Cult from their 1976 album Agents of Fortune
 ETİ, various Turkish companies such as Eti Mine Works and :tr:Eti (şirket)